Ramsey Route 17 is one of two railroad stations operated by New Jersey Transit in the borough of Ramsey, Bergen County, New Jersey, United States. Named after nearby Route 17, trains at the station are serviced by the Main Line and Bergen County Line, along with Metro-North Railroad's Port Jervis Line.

History
The current station at Ramsey Route 17 is located next to the Westervelt–Ackerson House on Island Road, which saw service beginning on October 19, 1848, with the opening of the Paterson and Ramapo Railroad. The train went from Paterson to Suffern, where connections were available to the Erie Railroad. The station was known as Westervelt's. The current station opened on August 22, 2004.

Station layout
The station has two tracks, each with a high-level side platform. It also has a pedestrian overpass complete with elevators, making it accessible for handicapped persons, and a quintuple-level parking structure to help serve as a park and ride.

Gallery

References

External links

 Station from Route 17 from Google Maps Street View

NJ Transit Rail Operations stations
Railway stations in the United States opened in 2004
Ramsey, New Jersey
2004 establishments in New Jersey
Railway stations in Bergen County, New Jersey
Railway stations in the United States opened in 1848